Visualizer or visualiser may refer to:

 Visualizer (advertising), or storyboard artist
 Visualizer (education), an image capture devices for displaying an object to a large audience
 Music visualizer, generating animated imagery based on a piece of music

See also

 Visualization (disambiguation)
Architectural illustrator
Scientific visualization
Software visualization